Szabolcs Mánya (born 30 January 1989), is a Romanian futsal player who plays for Odorheiu Secuiesc and the Romanian national futsal team.

References

External links 
 UEFA profile

1989 births
Living people
Romanian men's futsal players
Romanian sportspeople of Hungarian descent